Chris Deaner is an American drummer, film maker and computer programmer. He is best known as the drummer for Plus/Minus from 2001 onwards, as a founding member of Loudest Boom Bah Yea, and as the drummer for Kelly Clarkson from 2007 to 2008. He has directed a majority of videos for Plus/Minus and won the Best Video award at the 7th Annual San Diego Asian Film Festival for his direction of the band's Steal the Blueprints clip.

Deaner worked as a lead programmer on the multiplayer online game Code of Everand.

He is notable as an endorser of Ludwig Drums, Vic Firth and Istanbul Cymbals.

References

American drummers
Living people
Year of birth missing (living people)